The Robert Lang filmography lists the film and television appearances of English actor Robert Lang.

Film

Television

External links

Male actor filmographies
British filmographies